Eucithara trivittata is a small sea snail, a marine gastropod mollusk in the family Mangeliidae.

Description
The length of the shell attains 6.5 mm.

The shell has an ovate shape, attenuated at both ends. It is smooth, transparent, shining and its sculpture consists of longitudinally cloes ribs. Its color is whitish, brown at the base, sometimes with three narrow, interrupted bands. It is also characterized by small, wavy spiral striae that are little protruding.

Distribution
This marine species occurs off the Philippines.

References

External links
  Tucker, J.K. 2004 Catalog of recent and fossil turrids (Mollusca: Gastropoda). Zootaxa 682:1-1295.
 

trivittata
Gastropods described in 1850